Rišardas Malachovskis (born April 28, 1965) is a retired male decathlete whose career kicked off by him representing the Soviet Union and later Lithuania. He set his personal best score (8437 points) on July 2, 1988 at a meeting in Minsk. He gained the national title in 1991.

References
 1991 Year List
 

1965 births
Living people
Lithuanian decathletes
Place of birth missing (living people)
Soviet decathletes
20th-century Lithuanian people